Abacetus submetallicus is a species of ground beetle in the subfamily Pterostichinae. It was described by Nietner in 1858.

References

submetallicus
Beetles described in 1858